Ywatha is a village in Wetlet Township, Shwebo District, in south-western Sagaing Region in Burma (Myanmar), on the right (west) bank of the Irrawaddy River.

References

External links
 "Ywatha Map — Satellite Images of Ywatha" Maplandia

Populated places in Sagaing Region